Joshua Brent Weller is an English comedian, musician, comic-book writer, and podcast host.

Career
Weller's first solo single "Pretty Girls" was released on Yodel in 2008, followed by EP Push, again on Yodel in 2009, produced by Ryan Hadlock who had recently completed Gossip's Standing in the Way of Control and Johnny Flynn & The Sussex Wit's A Larum. Both releases sold out, with Push entering the UK Indie Chart at number 11.

Weller has toured and played with Mumford and Sons, The Offspring, Jack Garratt, Stereophonics, Descendents, The Noisettes, The Maccabees (Orlando Weeks, lead vocalist, created Josh's 'trademark' Logo), Florence and The Machine, Born Ruffians, The XX, Johnny Flynn and Paloma Faith 
 since he began playing live in 2008.

In 2009, Weller released the seasonal single "It's Christmas (And I Hate You)", a duet with Paloma Faith. He also wrote two songs for Brazilian singer Cibelle's 2010 album Las Venus Resort Palace Hotel.

In April 2014, Weller started the Excitable Boy Podcast, a weekly comedy and music podcast. Guests have included Gemma Arterton, Lianne La Havas, Juliet Simms, Neck Deep, Kevin Lyman, Bebe Rexha, Geoff Lloyd, Steve Furst and comedian Alex Edelman.

Weller provided lead guitar and vocals for punk band The Kenneths until the band's demise in December 2018.

In 2018 Weller released Die Already, a ten part comic book series, with CollegeHumor's subscription service Dropout.

Weller featured in season three of ITV 2's The Stand Up Sketch Show.

Weller habitually edits his own Wikipedia page to falsely report his death in bizarre circumstances, using obituaries for other individuals of the same name as citations.

References

External links
 
 
 
 
  statistics and tagging at Last.FM

1989 births
Living people
English male singer-songwriters
English pop singers
21st-century English singers
21st-century British male singers